Michele Conti may refer to:

Michele Conti (politician) (born 1970), Italian politician
Michele Conti (motorcyclist) (born 1983), Italian motorcycle racer

Conti, Michele